David C. Kirkpatrick  was an American politician who served as a Socialist member of the Oklahoma House of Representatives representing Dewey County between 1914 and 1916. He was one of the first third party candidates elected to the Oklahoma House of Representatives alongside fellow Socialist Party Representatives Thomas Henry McLemore, N. D. Pritchett, Charles Henry Ingham, and Sydney W. Hill.

Political career
Kirkpatrick was elected to the Oklahoma House of Representatives in 1914 as a Socialist. After losing re-election in 1916, Kirkpatrick ran as the Socialist nominee for an Oklahoma Senate district. He later ran for an Oklahoma House of Representatives seat in Dewey County under the Farmer-Labor Party in 1924.

Death
Kirkpatrick died on November 7, 1941 and he is buried in Brumfield Cemetery in Seiling, Oklahoma.

References

20th-century American politicians
20th-century Members of the Oklahoma House of Representatives
Oklahoma Farmer–Laborites
Socialist Party members of the Oklahoma House of Representatives
Year of birth missing
1941 deaths